Ranki Oberoi (born 21 September 1993) is a Dutch Paralympic athlete competing in T20-classification long jump and triple jump events. At the 2019 World Championships held in Dubai, United Arab Emirates, he won the gold medal in the men's long jump T20 event. He also represented the Netherlands at the 2020 Summer Paralympics in Tokyo, Japan

Career 

In 2014, he finished in 4th place in the men's long jump T20 event at the 2014 IPC Athletics European Championships held in Swansea, United Kingdom.

He competed at the 2015 World Championships in Doha, Qatar where he won the bronze medal in the men's triple jump T20 event. He also competed at the 2017 World Championships where he finished in 4th place in the men's long jump T20 event. At the 2018 European Championships held in Berlin, Germany, he won the bronze medal in the men's long jump T20 event.

He also represented the Netherlands at the 2016 Summer Paralympics in Rio de Janeiro, Brazil and he finished in 4th place in the men's long jump T20 event.

Achievements

References

External links 
 

Living people
1993 births
Place of birth missing (living people)
Dutch male long jumpers
Dutch male triple jumpers
Athletes (track and field) at the 2016 Summer Paralympics
Athletes (track and field) at the 2020 Summer Paralympics
Paralympic athletes of the Netherlands
Intellectual Disability category Paralympic competitors
World Para Athletics Championships winners
21st-century Dutch people